Pistacia integerrima is a species of pistachio tree native to Asia, commonly called zebrawood. It is often classified as Pistacia chinensis ssp. integerrima. It is used for a variety of purposes in India, including timber, dye, and fodder. The leaf galls are used in traditional herbalism for cough, asthma, fever, vomiting, and diarrhea.

Long, horn-shaped leaf galls that often develop on this tree are harvested and used to make kakadshringi, an herbal medicine for diarrhea in northern India.

This tree is also used as a rootstock in the cultivation of commercial pistachios.

References

integerrima
Medicinal plants
Flora of India (region)
Trees of Nepal